Wolcott Mill Metropark is a Huron-Clinton Metropark located in rural Ray Township, Michigan. The northern branch of the Clinton River is a fixture of the park as it bisects the entirety of the park.

The Park
The park covers 2,625 acres (1,062 hectares) and features a variety of activities. The golf course closed and is now walking trails. Wolcott Mill also has "Camp Rotary", a camping area for organized youth groups.

The Mill
The park's namesake mill was built in 1847 and operated until 1967. The mill was both a grist and a feed mill, and the machinery used for this purpose is still viewable. In addition, there are exhibits, demonstrations, and other buildings viewable in the Mill complex.  The barn museum features the history of American barns, a buggy, antique farming equipment and tools.  The various hiking trails of Wolcott Mill also start near the Mill complex.

The Farm
Wolcott Mill has a 250-acre (101 hectares) working farm. The farm has a herd of dairy cows as well as chickens, goats, pigs, sheep, and horses. There are also a variety of crops planted in the fields surrounding the farm.

External links
 Wolcott Mill Metropark - Huron-Clinton Metroparks

Huron–Clinton Metroparks
Mill museums in the United States
Museums in Macomb County, Michigan
Industry museums in Michigan
Protected areas of Macomb County, Michigan